Faiz Muhammad Khan Bahadur, (r.1742–1777) the third Nawab of Bhopal, was the son of Yar Muhammad Khan, the second Nawab of Bhopal (as a reagent), and the stepson of Mamola Bai a very influential Hindu wife of Y Muhammad and a direct descendant of Dost Mohammad Khan.

See also
Muhammad Shah
Alamgir II

References

Nawabs of Bhopal
1731 births
1777 deaths